Oh Feel Young (lit. Oh! Pil-seung and Bong Soon-young) is a 2004 South Korean television series starring Ahn Jae-wook, Chae Rim, Ryu Jin and Park Sun-young. It aired on KBS2 from September 13 to November 2, 2004 on Mondays and Tuesdays at 21:55 for 16 episodes.

Plot
Oh Pil-seung is a free-spirited, uneducated and somewhat lazy ordinary guy. One day, he gets identified as the long-lost grandson of a wealthy CEO and finds himself heir apparent to a top-level logistics company. Pil-seung struggles to rise to the challenge of his new responsibilities with the help of his stoic and perfectly efficient secretary Noh Yoo-jung, but his snobbish rivals and detractors gleefully wait for him to screw up.

Bong Soon-young is the manager of a large discount store, and a veteran of disastrous relationships. Always wearing her heart on her sleeve, she falls for the stable, well-educated, and intelligent Yoon Jae-woong, who looks to be a perfect catch. But then she meets Pil-seung, who gets in the way of their romance. Initially annoyed at his boorish personality, as Soon-young gets to know Pil-seung, she begins to appreciate what a decent, warm-hearted human being he is.

Cast

Main characters
 Ahn Jae-wook as Oh Pil-seung  
 Chae Rim as Bong Soon-young 
 Ryu Jin as Yoon Jae-woong
 Park Sun-young as Noh Yoo-jung

Supporting characters
 Choo Ja-hyun as Heo Song-ja
 Moon Chun-shik as Bong Jin-pyo, Soon-young's brother
 Yeo Woon-kay as Chairwoman Shin, Pil-seung's grandmother
 Jang Yong as Secretary Yoon, Jae-woong's father
 Lee Jung-gil as Bong Chang-soo, Soon-young's father
 Kim Hae-sook as Park Ok-ja, Soon-young's mother
 Kang Shin-il as Managing Director Min
 Yoon Sung-hoon as Seo Young-suk, Pil-seung's chauffeur
 Kim Seung-wook as Kim
 Lee Dal-hyung as Lee
 Shin Dong-wook
 Choi Yong-min
 Jung Suk-yong
 Lee Sung-min as Park
 Park Soo-hyun

Awards and nominations

References

External links
 Oh Feel Young official KBS website 
 

Korean-language television shows
Korean Broadcasting System television dramas
2004 South Korean television series debuts
2004 South Korean television series endings
South Korean romantic comedy television series
Television shows written by Kang Eun-kyung
Television series by Kim Jong-hak Production